Maria la Bailadora (d. after 1571), was a Spanish soldier. She famously participated in the Battle of Lepanto in 1571 dressed as a man. She is portrayed in the novel Clash of Empires: The Red Sea by William Napier.

References

16th-century Spanish women
Women in 16th-century warfare
16th-century Spanish military personnel
Battle of Lepanto
Female wartime cross-dressers
Spanish female military personnel